John Pomara is an American abstract artist.

Life
Pomara was born in Dallas in 1952 and received a MFA and a BFA from East Texas State University; he also attended the Empire State Studio Arts Program, New York.

Work 
Entropy and mechanical failure are prevalent themes within his work; in his endeavors to visually represent these errors he utilizes printers, copy machines and the Internet. Even the medium upon which he works is evocative of his underlying message, the industrial surfaces of the aluminum panels complementing and enhancing his artistic vision. Pomara's work is oftentimes inspired by the paint drips and spills that landed on the newspaper covering his studio floor.

He teaches at University of Texas, Dallas.

Permanent collections
Blanton Museum of Art, Austin, TX
Museum of Art, Dallas, TX 
Museum of Fine Arts, Houston, TX
American Airlines, Dallas, TX
The Barrett Collection, Dallas, TX  
Neiman Marcus, Dallas, TX
Tyler Museum of Art, Tyler, TX

References

External links
Horton Gallery Website
Review: Arrival and Departure
Best of Dallas: Artist
Review: John Pomara

20th-century American painters
American male painters
21st-century American painters
21st-century American male artists
1952 births
American abstract artists
Artists from Texas
Living people
20th-century American male artists